An anion exchange membrane (AEM) is a semipermeable membrane generally made from ionomers and designed to conduct anions but reject gases such as oxygen or hydrogen.

Applications 
Anion exchange membranes are used in electrolytic cells and fuel cells to separate reactants present around the two electrodes while transporting the anions essential for the cell operation. An important example is the hydroxide anion exchange membrane used to separate the electrodes of a direct methanol fuel cell (DMFC) or direct-ethanol fuel cell (DEFC).

Poly(fluorenyl-co-aryl piperidinium) (PFAP)-based anion exchange materials (electrolyte membrane and electrode binder) with high ion conductivity and durability under alkaline conditions has been demonstrated for use to extract hydrogen from water. Performance was 7.68 A/cm2, some 6x the performance of existing materials. Its yield is about 1.2 times that of commercial proton exchange membrane technology (6 A/cm2), and it does not require the use of expensive rare earth elements. The system works by increasing the specific surface area.

See also
Alkaline anion exchange membrane fuel cells
Alkaline fuel cell
Artificial membrane
Gas diffusion electrode
Glossary of fuel cell terms
Ion exchange
Ion-exchange membranes
Proton-exchange membrane

References

Fuel cells
Electrochemistry
Polymers
Hydrogen technologies
Membrane technology